Dennis Creek is an  tributary of Delaware Bay in Cape May County, New Jersey in the United States.

It originates in the Great Cedar Swamp to the southeast of Dennisville, New Jersey. Passing between Dennisville and South Dennis, it descends into the tidal marshes and joins Sluice Creek and thereafter forms the boundary between Dennis and Middle Townships. Further below, the channel of Roaring Ditch directs much of the flow of East Creek into Dennis Creek before reaching the bay.

Tributaries
Roaring Ditch
Old Robins Branch
Crow Creek
Sluice Creek

See also
List of rivers of New Jersey

References

Rivers of Cape May County, New Jersey
Rivers of New Jersey
Tributaries of Delaware Bay